Henry Standing Bear ( – 1953) ("Matȟó Nážiŋ") was an Oglala Lakota Chief. A founding member of the Society of American Indians (1911–1923), he recruited and commissioned Polish-American sculptor Korczak Ziolkowski to build the Crazy Horse Memorial in the Black Hills of South Dakota.

His brother was writer and actor Luther Standing Bear.

References

1870s births
1953 deaths
Oglala people
Carlisle Indian Industrial School alumni
People from the Pine Ridge Indian Reservation, South Dakota
Members of the Society of American Indians
Native American activists
Native Americans' rights activists